The Government of Serbia under Zoran Đinđić as the Prime Minister was formed on 25 January 2001. It is the first post-Milošević government formed after Serbian parliamentary elections held on 23 December 2000, when the Democratic Opposition of Serbia coalition (DOS) won 64.09% of the popular vote translating into 176 seats in the Serbian National Assembly (out of 250 seats). 

Zoran Đinđić, the leader of the Democratic Party, was designated as Prime Minister and given the task of forming Serbia's first freely elected post-communist and post-Milošević Government. The Government was sworn in on 25 January 2001 and its term officially ended on March 3, 2004, when the new government under PM Vojislav Koštunica was unveiled following the 2003 Serbian parliamentary election held in late December.

When PM Zoran Đinđić was assassinated on March 12, 2003, Nebojša Čović (one of the five deputy PMs at the time) became the acting PM for four days until Zoran Živković got named as the new Prime Minister on March 16, 2003.

After Đinđić's assassination, the government also went through a slight reconfiguration as Čedomir Jovanović, up to that point DOS' parliamentary club chief, became deputy PM.

Composition

Deputy Ministers

The Deputy Ministers in the Serbian Government appointed in February 2001 were:

Mirko Cvetković, Deputy Minister of Economy and Privatisation (appointed Prime Minister of Serbia in July 2008)
Dejan Popović, Deputy Minister of Finance
Dragan Marković, Deputy Minister of Agriculture, Forestry and Water Management
Đurđe Ninković, Deputy Minister of Justice
Dimitrije Vukčević, Deputy Minister of Energy and Mining
Zoran Radivojević, Deputy Minister of Transport and Telecommunications
Radojko Obradović, Deputy Minister of Construction and Urban Planning
Ferenc Mokanj, Deputy Minister of Trade, Tourism and Services
Dobrosav Milovanović, Deputy Minister of International Economic Relations
Dušan Protić, Deputy Minister of Public Administration and Local Self-Government
Nebojša Miletić, Deputy Minister of Labour and Employment 
Liljana Lučić, Deputy Minister for Social Affairs
Radojica Pešić, Deputy Minister for Science, Technology and Development
Vigor Majić, Deputy Minister of Education and Sport
Uroš Jovanović, Deputy Minister of Health and Environmental Protection, 2001-02
Dragan Celiković, Deputy Minister of Health
Živojin Stjepić, Deputy Minister of Religion

(The post of Deputy Minister has since 2004 been abolished and a new post of State Secretary (državni sekretar) has been instituted (of which there are several in each Ministry).

See also
Cabinet of Serbia (2000–01)
Cabinet of Serbia (2004–2007)
Cabinet of Serbia (2007–08)
Cabinet of Serbia (2008–2012)
Cabinet of Serbia (2012–2014)
Cabinet of Serbia

References

1. ^ Official Gazette of the Republic of Serbia No.14, 23 February 2001.

External links
 The Government of Serbia 

Government of Serbia (2001-2004)
2001 establishments in Serbia
2004 disestablishments in Serbia
Cabinets established in 2001
Cabinets disestablished in 2004